The 1970 Pittsburgh Steelers season was the franchise's 38th in the National Football League. They improved from a league-worst 1–13 record the previous year, finishing with a 5–9 record and third place in the newly formed AFC Central. The Steelers began the decade in a new conference and a new stadium with a new quarterback. After nearly 40 years in the NFL they shifted to the AFC, to complete the merger between the NFL and AFL. It was the NFL's weakest division that season, as the Steelers finished three games behind the division-winning Cincinnati Bengals—a team that was only in its third year of existence that season.

Offseason
Coach Chuck Noll's reshaping of the squad from the year before continued for 1970.

Undoubtedly the greatest change that took place was Chuck Noll's trade of the team's lone superstar, Roy Jefferson.  Although Jefferson was among the league leaders in receiving in 1968 and 1969, despite playing for the worst team in football with mediocre quarterbacks, he was sent packing after being publicly vocal in criticizing team management. The trade sent Jefferson to Baltimore, where he earned a Super Bowl ring. Years later, Jefferson pinpointed what he had done to get traded.

"I was [in Baltimore] to make a statement. I wanted to show Pittsburgh they'd made a mistake in getting rid of me. I mean, I wasn't a 'yes' man for coach Chuck Noll. If you cursed me, I cursed you back. I messed over the curfew rules a lot and, in training camp, I'd park my car in the coaches' spaces."

Hence, 1970 brought change with Ron Shanklin emerging as a steady receiver for the next few years until John Stallworth and Lynn Swann joined the team in 1974.

As a result of the NFL-AFL merger being finalized for the 1970 season, three teams from the "old" NFL were moved to the newly formed AFC alongside the former AFL teams. The Steelers agreed to be one of them after their archrivals, the Cleveland Browns, volunteered to join the AFL franchises in the AFC. The Browns mainly joined because of the possibility of an intrastate rivalry with the AFL's Cincinnati Bengals (now known as the Battle of Ohio), largely due to the animosity at the time between Browns owner Art Modell and Bengals owner & coach Paul Brown, who was fired from the Browns by Modell after the 1962 season. The Steelers joined the AFC in order to keep the Browns-Steelers rivalry alive on a regular basis, due to the proximity of the cities of Pittsburgh and Cleveland.

Another change came in the draft. For the first time since 1956, the Steelers owned the number one selection in the draft after winning a coin toss with the Chicago Bears for the top pick, as the two teams had identical 1–13 records in 1969. (The Steelers would have won the tiebreaker under the modern NFL tiebreaker rules anyway, since the Bears' one win was against the Steelers in week 8 of that season.)

In the 1970 NFL Draft, only two Hall of Famers were selected in all 17 Rounds and 442 Picks. One being 1st Round, 1st Pick selection Terry Bradshaw, and the second being 3rd Round, 53rd Pick Mel Blount. Bradshaw and Blount, both part of the '70s Steeler Dynasty, were both inducted into the Hall of Fame in 1989. In his 14-year professional career, Bradshaw got off on a bumpy start from 1970–1975. Bradshaw threw a career-high 24 interceptions and only 6 touchdown passes. In wasn't until 1976 that Bradshaw's career began to peak. Blount's career was an overall consistent one. In 1975, he intercepted 11 passes for 121 yards.

In 1966, the NFL agreed on a merger with the rival AFL (American Football League). In 1970, the merger became final, as a result of the merger, the AFC (American Football Conference) featuring all the AFL teams and the NFC (National Football Conference) featuring all the "old" NFL teams. Two teams from the NFL were asked to join the AFL in the AFC, the Baltimore Colts, and the Cleveland Browns (the Browns owner, Art Modell asked the NFL Commissioner, Pete Rozelle if he could join to play the Cincinnati Bengals in the Battle of Ohio). Upon hearing this, Art Rooney (Steelers Owner) asked Rozelle if he could join to keep the Steelers-Browns rivalry alive. So, the Steelers would begin playing in the AFC and would leave the Eagles rivalry and many others they had playing the NFC teams. Also, the Steelers moved into the then state-of-the-art, Three Rivers Stadium and left Pitt Stadium. The new Three Rivers was one of the many "cookie-cutter" stadiums across the league and became an icon to Pittsburgh.

The opening of Three Rivers ended their relatively brief stay at Pitt Stadium, where they had only been playing on a full-time basis for six years. Before that, the Steelers played most of their home games at Forbes Field, with occasional games being played at Pitt Stadium to take advantage of the larger capacity. The Steelers later returned the favor to the University of Pittsburgh in 2000 when the Pitt Panthers football team moved into Three Rivers for one season as an interim home before Heinz Field was ready in 2001. Pitt would also play their Backyard Brawl games against West Virginia in years Pitt hosted the game during the existence of Three Rivers.

WTAE-TV sportscaster Myron Cope joined the Steelers radio network as color commentator for the 1970 season. Cope remained a fixture of the Steelers radio network through the 2004 season and became beloved by fans due to his enthusiasm and catchphrases behind the announcing booth. In 1975, Cope invented the Terrible Towel, originally conceived as a gimmick in the Steelers playoff game against Baltimore and now a staple among Steelers fans.

Personnel

Staff

Roster

Regular season

Schedule

Game summaries

Week 1  

Scoring drives:

 Houston – LeVias 22 pass from Johnson (Gerela kick) HOU 7–0
 Houston – LeVias 10 pass from Johnson (Gerela kick) HOU 14–0
 Houston – Safety, Bradshaw forced out of end zone by Pritchard HOU 16–0
 Houston – FG Gerela 8 HOU 19–0
 Pittsburgh – Shanklin 15 pass from Hanratty (Mingo kick) HOU 19–7
The Steelers played their first regular season game at the brand new Three Rivers Stadium. Terry Bradshaw made his NFL debut, but struggled, going 4 for 16 for 40 yds. Bradshaw was also sacked for a safety, the first of three straight games in which this would happen. With the loss, the Steelers dropped to 0-1.

Week 2  

Scoring drives:

 Denver – Crenshaw 1 run (Howfield kick) DEN 7–0
 Pittsburgh – Hoak 4 run (Mingo kick)  T 7–7
 Pittsburgh – FG Mingo 9  PIT 10–7
 Pittsburgh – FG Mingo 13 PIT 13–7
 Denver – Safety, Washington tackled Bradshaw in end zone PIT 13–9
 Denver – Van Heusen 38 pass from Tensi (Howfield kick)DEN 16–13

With the loss, the Steelers fell to 0–2.

Week 3 

Scoring drives:

 Cleveland – Safety, Bradshaw tackled in end zone by Snidow CLE 2–0
 Pittsburgh – Bradshaw 22 run (Mingo kick) PIT 7–2
 Cleveland – Morrison 53 pass from Phipps (kick failed)CLE 8–7
 Cleveland – Barnes 38 pass interception return (Cockroft kick) CLE 15–7

With the loss, the Steelers fell to 0–3.

Week 4 

Scoring drives:

 Pittsburgh – FG Mingo 28 PIT 3–0
 Buffalo – FG Guthrie 52 T 3–3
 Pittsburgh – Smith 6 pass from Hanratty (Mingo kick) PIT 10–3
 Buffalo – Simpson 4 run (Guthrie kick) T 10–10
 Pittsburgh – FG Mingo 49 PIT 13–10
 Pittsburgh – Pearson 2 run (Mingo kick) PIT 20–10
 Pittsburgh – FG Mingo 43 PIT 23–10

The Steelers won their first game, improving to 1–3.

Week 5  

Scoring drives:

 Houston – Gerela 34 yard field goal – HOU 3–0
 Pittsburgh – Shanklin 67 yard pass from Bradshaw (Mingo kick) – PIT 7–3

With the win, the Steelers improved to 2–3 and split the regular season series with the Oilers.

Week 6 

Scoring drives:

 Oakland – Chester 37 pass from Lamonica (Blanda kick) OAK 7–0
 Pittsburgh – Pearson 2 run (Mingo kick) T 7–7
 Oakland – Wells 44 pass from Blanda (Blanda kick) OAK 14–7
 Oakland – FG Blanda 27 OAK 17–7
 Oakland – Chester 19 pass from Blanda (Blanda kick) OAK 24–7
 Pittsburgh – Hughes 12 pass from Bradshaw (Mingo kick) OAK 24–14
 Oakland – Chester 43 pass from Blanda (Blanda kick) OAK 31–14

In the first in what would become many regular and postseason games between these 2 teams, the Steelers would lose the very first game to the Raiders as the team dropped to 2–4.

Week 7 

Scoring drives:

 Cincinnati – Crabtree 2 pass from Carter (Muhlmann kick) CIN 7–0
 Pittsburgh – Hughes 27 pass from Hoak (Mingo kick) T 7–7
 Cincinnati – FG Muhlmann 43 CIN 10–7
 Pittsburgh – Hughes 72 pass from Hanratty (Mingo kick) PIT 14–10
 Pittsburgh – Bankston 2 run (Mingo kick)PIT 21–10
First Monday night football game played at Three Rivers Stadium.

The Steelers won the very first game between them and the Bengals and the teams' record improved to 3–4.

Week 8 

Scoring drives:

 New York Jets – FG Turner 17 NYJ 3–0
 Pittsburgh – Fuqua 1 run (Mingo kick) PIT 7–3
 Pittsburgh – Bankston 12 run (Mingo kick) PIT 14–3
 New York Jets – Mercein 15 pass from Woodall (Turner kick) PIT 14–10
 Pittsburgh – Fuqua 6 pass from Hanratty (Mingo kick) PIT 21–10
 New York Jets – Nock 1 run (Turner kick) PIT 21–17

With the win, the Steelers improved to 4–4.

Week 9  

Scoring drives:

 Kansas City – FG Stenerud 32 KC 3–0
 Kansas City – Cannon 20 pass from Dawson (Stenerud kick) KC 10–0
 Pittsburgh – Fuqua 2 run (Mingo kick) KC 10–7
 Kansas City – Cannon 8 pass from Dawson (Stenerud kick) KC 17–7
 Kansas City – Taylor 42 pass from Dawson (Stenerud kick) KC 24–7
 Pittsburgh – Staggers 7 pass from Bradshaw (Mingo kick) KC 24–14
 Kansas City – Holmes 2 run (Stenerud kick) KC 31–14

The game is infamously known with Dave Smith dropping the ball while attempting to score a touchdown. With the loss, the Steelers fell to 4–5.

Week 10 

Scoring drives:

 Cincinnati – FG Muhlmann 17 CIN 3–0
 Cincinnati – FG Muhlmann 13 CIN 6–0
 Cincinnati – Carter 5 run (Muhlmann kick) CIN 13–0
 Pittsburgh – Fuqua 1 run (Mingo kick) CIN 13–7
 Cincinnati – Robinson 15 run (Muhlmann kick) CIN 20–7 
 Cincinnati – Trumpy 53 pass from Carter (Muhlmann kick) CIN 27–7
 Cincinnati – Crabtree 10 pass from Carter (Muhlmann kick) CIN 34–7

In their first ever game in Cincinnati, the Steelers would lose it by 27 points as the team dropped to 4–6.

Week 11  

Scoring drives:

 Pittsburgh – Shanklin 8 pass from Hanratty (Watson kick) PIT 7–0
 Cleveland – FG Cockroft 16 PIT 7–3
 Cleveland – FG Cockroft 38 PIT 7–6
 Pittsburgh – Beatty 30 interception return (Watson kick) PIT 14–6
 Cleveland – FG Cockroft 46 PIT 14–9
 Pittsburgh -Shanklin 81 pass from Bradshaw (Watson kick) PIT 21–9
 Pittsburgh – Fuqua 57 pass from Bradshaw (Watson kick) PIT 28–9

With the win, the Steelers improved to 5–6 and finished 3–3 in their division.

Week 12 

Scoring drives:

 Green Bay – Krause 100 kickoff return (kick failed) GB 6–0
 Pittsburgh – FG Watson 15 GB 6–3
 Pittsburgh – Smith 87 pass from Bradshaw (kick failed) PIT 9–6
 Green Bay – McGeorge 13 pass from Starr (Livingston kick) GB 13–9
 Pittsburgh – FG Watson 45 GB 13–12
 Green Bay – Hilton 65 pass from Starr (Livingston kick) GB 20–12

Week 13 

Scoring drives:

 Atlanta – Malone 5 pass from Johnson (Vinyard kick) ATL 7–0
 Pittsburgh – Fuqua 10 run (kick failed) ATL 7–6
 Pittsburgh – FG Watson 21 PIT 9–7
 Atlanta – FG Vinyard 35 ATL 10–9
 Pittsburgh – Fuqua 1 run (Watson kick) PIT 16–10
 Atlanta – FG Vinyard 17 PIT 16–13
 Atlanta – Mitchell 12 run (Vinyard kick)ATL 20–16
 Atlanta – Flatley 18 pass from Johnson (Vinyard kick) ATL 27–16

Week 14 (Sunday December 20, 1970): Philadelphia Eagles  

Scoring drives:

 Pittsburgh – Fuqua 72 run (Watson kick) PIT 7–0
 Philadelphia – Hawkins 21 pass from Snead (kick failed) PIT 7–6
 Philadelphia – Dirks recovered blocked kick in end zone (Moseley kick) PHI 13–7
 Pittsburgh – Fuqua 85 run (Watson kick) PIT 14–13
 Philadelphia – Ballman 19 pass from Snead (Moseley kick)PHI 20–14
 Pittsburgh – FG Watson 21 PHI 20–17
 Pittsburgh – FG Watson 17 T 20–20 
 Philadelphia – FG Moseley 18 PHI 23–20
 Philadelphia – Watkins 1 run (Moseley kick) PHI 30–20

 John Fuqua would run for 218 yards

Standings

References

External links
 1970 Pittsburgh Steelers season at Profootballreference.com 
 1970 Pittsburgh Steelers season statistics at jt-sw.com 

Pittsburgh Steelers seasons
Pittsburgh Steelers
Pittsburgh Steel